Adam Hrycaniuk (born March 15, 1984) is a Polish professional basketball player for Arka Gdynia of the Polish Basketball League.

College career
After spending two years in community college, Hrycaniuk spent the 2007–08 season with the Cincinnati Bearcats.

Professional career
From 2008 to 2013 he played with Asseco Prokom Gdynia of the Polish Basketball League.
 
In March 2013, he signed with Valencia Basket of the Spanish ACB League for the rest of the 2012–13 season.

In September 2013, he returned to Poland and signed with Stelmet Zielona Góra.

On June 26, 2019, he has signed contract with Arka Gdynia of the Polish Basketball League.

Polish national team
Hrycaniuk played for Poland national basketball team at the EuroBasket 2011 and EuroBasket 2013.

References

External links
Euroleague.net Profile

1984 births
Living people
Asseco Gdynia players
Barton Cougars men's basketball players
Basket Zielona Góra players
Cincinnati Bearcats men's basketball players
Liga ACB players
People from Barlinek
Polish expatriate basketball people in Spain
Polish expatriate basketball people in the United States
Polish men's basketball players
Sportspeople from West Pomeranian Voivodeship
Trinity Valley Cardinals men's basketball players
Valencia Basket players
2019 FIBA Basketball World Cup players
Centers (basketball)